Toyota Big Air is a Japanese snowboarding (Straight jump) contest. This contest has been held in the Makomanai Open Stadium, Sapporo, Hokkaido since 1997, and from 2012 at the Sapporo Dome. The organizing office of the event announced on September 30, 2014 that the event would no longer take place, making the previous event held on February 23, 2014 the final edition.

Winners

External links 
  
Official site  (No longer published)

Snowboarding competitions
International sports competitions hosted by Japan
Sport in Sapporo
Toyota